Abd Al-Rahman bin Abdullah al Shashi (b. 1829 - 1904), popularly known as Sheikh Sufi, was a 19th-century Somali scholar, poet, reformist and astrologist.

Life
Sheikh Sufi was born in Mogadishu, where he founded the Qadiriyyah congregation, an Islamic school of thought or tariqah whose disciples included colleagues of his such as Uways al-Barawi. He studied astrology and wrote extensively on the future of Mogadishu and religious sciences, and authored popular books such as Shadjarat al Yakim ("The Tree of Certitude").

Besides his scholarly career, Sheikh Sufi was known as a great mediator between merchants and shop keepers in the coastal cities. As a reformist, he is credited with having put an end to what he considered to be the urbanites' immoral dancing rituals. In private, he also wrote many poems, which would eventually be taken up by fellow scholars such as Abdallah al-Qutbi in their books.

Pilgrimage to his mausoleum
After his death in 1904, Shaykh Sufi's mausoleum became a site of annual pilgrimage for the faithful from across Somalia and East Africa.  A cemetery was eventually be constructed around his mausoleum, where prominent Somali ministers, entertainers and Presidents would also be buried.

See also
 Islam in Somalia
 Abdallah al-Qutbi

References

Ethnic Somali people
People from Mogadishu
19th-century Somalian people
Somalian religious leaders
Somalian scientists
Somalian poets
1829 births
1904 deaths
19th-century poets